Sunbather is the second studio album by the American metal band Deafheaven. After the release of their debut record Roads to Judah, the then two piece group consisting of George Clarke and Kerry McCoy began work on Sunbather under the label Deathwish and recorded in several days in January 2013. The recording process brought a third member into the fold with drummer Dan Tracy who would go on to become a permanent fixture of the band. The album was recorded in The Atomic Garden Recording Studio, owned by Jack Shirley who had been a long time producer of the band.

Although Deafheaven had been strongly influenced by black metal as well as other diverse metal acts, their music drew comparisons from music critics to shoegaze, post-rock, and alternative rock sounds. This trend was further continued on Sunbather. The melancholic songs featured in the album include Wall of Sound arrangements that are found in many shoegazing and post-rock acts, producing dense sounds that sometimes breakdown into slower, melodic parts that are then topped with vocalist George Clarke's reverb-soaked screaming style singing of lyrics. The album also contains a few interludes that include sampling, field recording, and droning.

Sunbather was released in June 2013 and received universal critical acclaim, with Metacritic acknowledging it as "the best-reviewed major album" of the year.

Background 
Deafheaven began as a band with vocalist George Clarke and guitarist Kerry McCoy as the two core musicians and songwriters. After getting the attention of record label Deathwish's co-founder Tre McCarthy when he found Deafheaven's untitled demo on the internet, the band was signed to its first record label. Despite being plagued with an inconsistent group line up since the inception of the band, Deafheaven were able to record their debut album Roads to Judah as a quintet. The album was met with favorable reviews noting its dynamic influences, such as music reviewing publication Pitchfork proclaiming that it "blends shredding West Coast black metal, Explosions in the Sky dynamics, a healthy My Bloody Valentine infatuation, a floor-punching hardcore sensibility, and anguished (but romantic) vocal eruptions by clean-cut frontman George Clarke."

Following a live album and a split EP release after Roads to Judah, the band was again a duo composed of Clarke and McCoy as the sole songwriters. As early as September 2011, Deafheaven announced it was recording music for a new release, with McCoy describing the material as "faster, darker, a lot heavier and far more experimental" than their debut album. As the band was nearing the recording date of Sunbather by December 2012 however, Clarke described their new material as less melancholic and less centered around black metal, but rather featuring a more "lush and rock-driven, even pop-driven" sound at times.

Recording and production 
After writing the entirety of Sunbather in an apartment Clarke and McCoy occupied in the year before its release, the two members went to record their work at Atomic Garden Studios in East Palo Alto. Although the duo discussed various different producers to work with, their decision came down to Jack Shirley who was valued for the comfort he gave the band since he had worked on all their previous records. On Shirley's performance as producer, Clarke said, "for this record, he definitely took on the role of producer much more than our previous efforts, which was awesome. It honestly felt like we accomplished this together and it felt great.". The recording process took six days in January 2013 with each day focusing mostly on recording specific instrumental tracks or completing album interludes. Each day of recording took approximately eight hours of work.

When the band recorded Roads to Judah, the members did not make production part of their main focus. As a result, Clarke and McCoy wanted Sunbather to sound "bigger and slicker" than previous releases. Musician Dan Tracy was brought in to work on the drumming. Noting Tracy's proficiency with percussion, Clarke detailed, "For me, drums have always been a bit of an afterthought which is strange because they certainly shape our sound, but as long as they were fast, I didn't care much otherwise. That is definitely not the case with this record. There are sections where drums absolutely make the song pop, which is a huge development." Tracy began work on the first day by recording the bulk of the percussion and concluding his contributions for two more hours on the second day using a four piece DW kit. The microphones used to record the drums varied depending on the role of the percussion in different parts of a track. Uptempo drum parts were recorded with closer microphones while "spacier sections" were recorded with ribbon microphones.

Guitar work was started on the second day with most of the day consisting of recording distorted guitar parts. Using a Gibson Les Paul, McCoy would typically track four guitar layers, tracking each rhythm and lead twice. Several different guitar pedals were used for distortion guitar to allow the "bigger and slicker" vision Deafheaven had for the record in conjunction with frequent use of a whammy bar to create a "dizzying effect" inspired by My Bloody Valentine's "glide guitar" technique. The following day began with recording bass guitar using a 1970s Fender Precision Bass model and quickly concludes to start on clean guitar parts. Although McCoy used a Les Paul for some of these parts, a Gretsch 6117 model was mostly played for recording, and again up to four guitar trackings are made for different parts.  On recording the clean guitars, Clarke notes, "recording always becomes fun around this time because the stressful bulk is completed and we're able to really experiment with different sounds and space, even using an EBow for the first time."

The next two days focused on clean sections and interludes. For these parts, a Kawai upright piano was employed as well as a 1960s Hammond M3 organ. The sixth and last day of recording involves small additions to the record and Clarke's vocals. To fit the sound aesthetic of the album, the vocal tracks were given echo chamber reverberation treatment during the mixing process. With the recordings finished, producer Jack Shirley continued work by mixing and mastering to finish the album. Sunbather was recorded on two-inch analog tape and converted to digital for final production to be done through Pro Tools before finally being mastered with an Ampex ATR-102 tape machine.

Music and lyrics 

Sunbather contains seven tracks: four songs ("Dream House", "Sunbather", "Vertigo" and "The Pecan Tree") and three interludes ("Irresistible", "Please Remember" and "Windows"). The decision to weave shorter interlude tracks in between longer songs was made in the studio. Kerry McCoy wrote many riffs prior to the Sunbather-studio sessions, some of which featured a more clean guitar tone, and Deafheaven wanted to make use of them in some fashion. George Clarke commented, "Some of the things [McCoy] was writing weren't fitting into anything in particular—they were their own little pieces. And so rather than trying to exhaust them in a longer song, we thought, 'We don't want to waste these riffs; maybe we could use them as interludes.'" Clarke also said the interludes are meant to aid the flow of the album by complementing other songs and that Sunbather is meant to be listened to "in one sitting all the way through." In categorizing Sunbather, Metal Hammer noted it had many influences and an "emotional palette" to the point where it wasn't a black metal record; the source compared its emotionalizing of extreme metal music tropes to the work of Amesoeurs and Alcest and its cinematic soundscapes to the works of The Cure, Mogwai, and Russian Circles.

The first interlude, "Irresistible", is completely instrumental, but the other two tracks feature samples and guest vocals layered over comparatively softer, cleaner sounding music. The track "Please Remember" features guest contributions from Stéphane "Neige" Paut of Alcest reading a passage from Milan Kundera's 1984 novel, The Unbearable Lightness of Being. Deafheaven met and became friends with Alcest when they toured together in March 2012, and wanted to collaborate musically. Originally, Paut was to contribute guest guitars, but because he lives in France and the distance makes musical collaboration difficult, he recorded himself reading the passage chosen by Deafheaven and sent that instead. The Unbearable Lightness of Being is one of Clarke's favorite books and he said that, "That passage is really important to me. It just screams insecurity, which I have huge faults with." The final interlude, "Windows", features two interlacing audio samples. The first is a recording of McCoy during a drug deal. Around the time of recording Sunbather, McCoy was addicted to pharmaceutical opiates and Clarke wanted to record one of his drug deals to include something that was very personal to his fellow band member. The second is a live recording of preacher in downtown San Francisco, California, about which Clarke said, "they're there all the time, yelling at crowds." (Cf. John Adam's Christian Zeal and Activity.) Clarke commented on the content of "Windows", stating: "Thematically, it's supposed to be about this guy talking about the evils of hell intermixed with one's own personal hell and the actual realities like addiction and self-worth, not the fire and brimstone. [McCoy] didn't have a lot of money, and he was kind of desperate; he's showcasing the true horrors that are here on earth—one's own personal demons."

Artwork and title 
The cover artwork for Sunbather was designed by Nick Steinhardt of Touché Amoré, who also designed the band's 2011 debut album Roads to Judah. The original photograph is credited to Ryan Aylsworth. The pink and orange colors on the cover are meant to resemble the color seen on the inside of one's eyelids when lying in the sun. The inspiration to have the title Sunbather written out in a simple, block formation was drawn from Pulp's 2001 album We Love Life. George Clarke named the album "Sunbather" because, "that's the feeling it gives me. It is the sadness and the frustration and the anger that comes with striving for perfection. Dreaming of warmth and love despite the pain of idealism."

Critical reception 

Sunbather was met with widespread critical acclaim. At Metacritic, which assigns a normalized rating out of 100 to reviews from mainstream critics, the album received an average score of 92, based on 18 reviews, which indicates "universal acclaim". The album's varying compositional techniques and styles garnered it much buzz with non-metal journalists and listeners, especially with indie music publications due to its shoegaze and post-rock stylings. As Clarke responded to the reception, "Even on the positive side, when we'd get a review or a write-up or something and people were like, you know, 'this album is amazing' and 'it's breaking so much ground' and all this kind of stuff — that's almost harder to read than the negative stuff sometimes. Because we always feel like, you know what? It's just a band, and it's just songs."

Consequence of Sound claimed Sunbather was better than Roads to Judah for being more dynamic and rejecting the "awkward gait and busy feel" of the 2011 album. The dynamics were also praised by The A.V. Club for being "masterful[ly]" done and making it less redundant than most other black metal records. AllMusic noted another positive distinction from similar albums with Sunbather, the lyrics' light "poetic exploration" of otherwise dark subject matter, which "gives the listener time to really internalize and reflect upon the lyrics rather than react viscerally, making for an altogether deeper experience for those willing to take the time to really take the album in." The main praise in Spins review was the album's difficult feat to unite elements of previously-established styles with "unwavering focus and unfaltering vision," suggesting it was great for listeners "to connect, to see our collective or individual anxieties massaged into something we can stream from the comfort of our homes."

Writing for Pitchfork, Brandon Stosuy labeled Sunbather "Best New Album" and stated: "With Sunbather, Deafheaven have made one of the biggest albums of the year, one that impresses you with its scale, the way Swans' The Seer did last year. Like M. Gira's masterpiece, it has the ability to capture the attention of people who don't normally listen to heavy music."

Accolades 

Sunbathers critical acclaim has led the album to be listed on several critic's "Best of 2013" lists, both in the US and internationally. Prior to the album's release, Sunbather was listed as an anticipated album of 2013 by Decibel, Noisecreep, The Skinny, Spin and Stereogum. In mid-2013, Spin, NPR and Metacritic declared the album to be one of the best albums of the year "thus far". Metacritic also declared that Sunbather was the best-reviewed album of 2013. Further, they wrote: "It's the first time a metal album has occupied the #1 slot in our year-end rankings. In fact, out of albums with 15 or more reviews (excluding EPs and reissues), Sunbather is now the 7th-highest scoring album in our database, which includes releases dating back to 1999." A "—" denotes the publication's list is in no particular order, and Sunbather did not rank numerically.

Year-end lists

Decade-end lists

All-time lists

Tracks

Commercial performance 
The album debuted at No. 130 on the Billboard 200 and at No. 10 in the Hard Rock Albums chart with 3,720 copies sold in its debut week in the US. The album had sold over 30,000 copies in the US as of April 2014.

Track listing 
All music and lyrics by Deafheaven.

Personnel 
Sunbather personnel adapted from liner notes.

Deafheaven
 George Clarke – vocals, piano
 Kerry McCoy – guitars, bass
 Daniel Tracy – drums

Additional personnel
 Stéphane "Neige" Paut (Alcest) – spoken word on "Please Remember"

Production and recording
 Deafheaven – production
 Jack Shirley – recording, production, editing, mixing, mastering

Artwork and design
 Ryan Aylsworth – photography
 Sara Mohr – model
 Nick Steinhardt (Touché Amoré) – art direction, design

Charts

References

External links 
 Sunbather at Bandcamp (streamed copy where licensed)

2013 albums
Deafheaven albums
Deathwish Inc. albums
Albums produced by Jack Shirley